Jean Richepin (4 February 1849 – 12 December 1926) was a French poet, novelist and dramatist.

Biography
Son of an army doctor, Jean Richepin was born 4 February 1849 at Médéa, French Algeria.

At school and at the École Normale Supérieure he gave evidence of brilliant, if somewhat undisciplined, powers, for which he found physical vent in different directions—first as a franc-tireur in the Franco-German War, and afterwards as actor, sailor and stevedore—and an intellectual outlet in the writing of poems, plays and novels which vividly reflected his erratic but unmistakable talent. A play, L'Étoile, written by him in collaboration with André Gill (1840–1885), was produced in 1873; but Richepin was virtually unknown until the publication, in 1876, of a volume of verse entitled La Chanson des gueux, when his outspokenness resulted in his being imprisoned and fined for outrage aux mœurs.

The same quality characterized his succeeding volumes of verse: Les Caresses (1877), Les Blasphèmes (1884), La Mer (1886), Mes paradis (1894), La Bombarde (1899). His novels have developed in style from the morbidity and brutality of Les morts bizarres (1876), La Glu (1881) and Le Pavé (1883) to the more thoughtful psychology of Madame André (1878), Sophie Monnier (1884), Cisarine (1888), L'Aîné (1893), Grandes amoureuses (1896) and La Gibasse (1899), and the more simple portrayal of life in Miarka (1883), Les Braves Gens (1886), Truandailles (1890), La Miseloque (1892) and Flamboche (1895).

His plays, though occasionally marred by his characteristic propensity for dramatic violence of thought and language, constitute in many respects his best work.  Most of these were produced at the Comédie française. During the 1880s he had an affair with Sarah Bernhardt, the greatest actress of the time.

Richepin adapted a libretto from his 1883 novel Miarka la fille à l'ours for Alexandre Georges' opera Miarka (1905), and Le mage (1891) for the music of Jules Massenet. A friend of Emmanuel Chabrier, he helped the composer to correct and salvage the libretto of Le roi malgré lui, as well as providing the words for the concert scène lyrique La Sulamite.  His novel La Glu was the basis for two other operas, by Gabriel Dupont (1910) and Camille Erlanger.

A friend of Arthur Rimbaud, Richepin was one of only "seven known recipients" of the first edition of A Season in Hell.

On 14 June 1913 a banquet, the Ligue des Gourmands, Xeme Diner d’Epicure was held at the Hyde Park Hotel in London. The menu was designed and a toast given by August Escoffier, the league's founder and at the time co-president with Richepin.
He died in Paris. His son Jacques Richepin was also a dramatist.

Bibliography
Nana Sahib (1883, play)
Monsieur Scapin (1886, play)
Le Flibustier (1888, play; the basis for an opera of the same name by César Cui)
Par le glaive (1892, play)
Vers la joie (1894, play)
Le Chemineau (1897, play)
Le Chien de garde (1898, play)
Les Truands (1899, play)
Don Quichotte (1905, play)
L'Aile, Roman des Temps Nouveaux (1911) translated as The Wing by Brian Stableford (2011) 
 Mères Françaises (1917, film, translated as Mothers of France), scenario for the war film directed by Louis Mercanton, starring Sarah Bernhardt
Nouvelle Mythologie Illustree, Tome I & II (1920)
Le Coin des Fous (1921) translated as The Crazy Corner by Brian Stableford (2013)

References

Sources

Further reading
 Arnold Guyot Cameron (1905). Selections from Jean Richepin, Silver, Burdett and Co.
 Kate Hyde Dunbar (1939). Jean Richepin, Poet and Dramatist, University of Georgia.
 Harry E. Wedeck (1947). "The Last of the French Bohemian Poets," The Modern Language Journal, Vol. 31, No. 8.
 Howard Sutton (1961). The Life and Work of Jean Richepin, Librairie Droz.

External links
 Works by Jean Richepin at Gallica

1849 births
1926 deaths
People from Médéa
Pieds-Noirs
École Normale Supérieure alumni
Members of the Académie Française
Commandeurs of the Légion d'honneur
French opera librettists
19th-century French poets
20th-century French poets
19th-century French dramatists and playwrights
20th-century French dramatists and playwrights
19th-century French novelists
20th-century French novelists
French military personnel of the Franco-Prussian War